Kapitia is a genus of spiders in the family Oonopidae. It was first described in 1956 by Forster. , it contains only one species, Kapitia obscura.

References

Oonopidae
Monotypic Araneomorphae genera
Spiders of New Zealand